Ramón García or Ramon Garcia may refer to:

 Ramón García (1990s pitcher) (born 1969),  former Venezuelan-American baseball pitcher
 Ramón García (gymnast) (born 1940), Spanish Olympic gymnast
 Ramón García (TV host), Spanish celebrity, aka Ramontxu, famous for his role on TV on 31 December
 Ramón García (1940s pitcher) (1924–2001), Cuban baseball pitcher
 Robert Hanssen, KGB agent, used the alias Ramon Garcia
 Ramón Fernando García (born 1972), Colombian road racing cyclist